SSJ may refer to the following:

 The IATA airport code for Sandnessjøen Airport, Stokka in Sandnessjøen, Nordland, Norway
 Siervas de San Jose, a religious congregation of the Roman Catholic Church
 Sisters of Saint Joseph, a Catholic religious order
 Soban Singh Jeena University, in Uttarakhand, India
 Stranka srpskog jedinstva, a political party that existed in Serbia from 1993 until 2007.
 Sukhoi Superjet 100, a fly-by-wire regional jet
 Super Saiyan from Dragon Ball Z